Laura Hyun Yi Kang(born  1967) is a Korean-American scholar and writer.

Kang is a professor of gender and sexuality studies in the School of Humanities at University of California, Irvine.  Kang holds a B.A. in ethnic studies and English from UC Berkeley and a Ph.D. from UC Santa Cruz.

Selected works 
 Traffic in Asian Women, Duke University Press, 2020
Writing Self, Writing Nation: A Collection of Essays on Dictee by Theresa Hak Kyung Cha, Third Women Press, 1994 (co-author)
 Compositional Subjects: Enfiguring Asian/American Women, Duke University Press, 2002
 Echoes upon Echoes: New Korean American Writings, Temple Univ Press, 2003 (co-author)
 Conjuring "Comfort Women": Mediated Affiliations and Disciplined Subjects in Korean/American Transnationality, Journal of Asian American Studies - Volume 6, Number 1, February 2003, pp. 25–55

Awards
 Association of Asian American Studies Book Award in Cultural Studies 2003
 UCI Chancellor's Award for Excellence in Undergraduate Research 1998

References

Living people
1967 births
American writers of Korean descent
University of California, Santa Cruz alumni
University of California, Irvine faculty